The Advocate-General of Bombay was charged with advising the Government of the British administered Bombay Presidency on legal matters. The Presidency existed from 1668 to 1947. Prior to 1858, when it was administered by the East India Company, the Advocate-General was the senior law officer of that company and also the Attorney-General of the Sovereign of Great Britain. He was an ex-officio member of the Legislative Council.

List of Advocates-General of Bombay
East India Company
Ollyett Woodhouse 1820–1822 
George Norton 1827–1828 (afterwards Advocate-General of Madras, 1828)
Richard Orlando Bridgeman 1828 (died in office of cholera)
James Dewar (acting) 1828–
Augustus Smith LeMesurier 1833–1856 
Sir Michael Roberts Westropp 1856–1857 

British Raj
Arthur James Lewis 1857–1865 (died in office)
Sir Michael Roberts Westropp 1861–1862
Lyttleton Holyoake Bayley 17 Mar 1866–1869 
James Sewell White 1869–
Sir Andrew Richard Scoble 1872–1877 
John Marriott 1877–1884 
Francis Law Latham 1884–1893 
Basil Lang 1893–1902 
Basil Scott 4 Feb 1902– 
(Sir) Pherozeshah Mehta 1908–
Thomas Joseph Strangman 1908–1915 
Malcolm Robert Jardine 1915–1916 
Thomas Joseph Strangman 1916–1922
Sir Jamshedjee Kanga 1922–1935
Bhulabhai Desai Mar 1926 (acting)
Sir Kenneth McIntyre Kemp 1935–
Noshirwanji Engineer 1942–1945  (afterwards Advocate-General of India, 1945)

See also
History of Bombay under British rule

References

Bombay
1820 establishments in the British Empire